Methodist Union was the joining together of several of the larger British Methodist denominations. These were the Wesleyan Methodists, the Primitive Methodists, and the United Methodists. The process involved many years of negotiation and discussion, as well as a vote by the members of each denomination to approve the union. In 1932 a Uniting Conference met on 20 September in the Royal Albert Hall, London. It adopted the Deed of Union as setting forth the basis of union and declaring and defining the constitution and doctrinal standards of the Methodist Church, and a new Model Deed was executed.

After 1932, the new united body was known simply as The Methodist Church. To distinguish this from Methodism in other countries (chiefly the United States), it is now styled the Methodist Church of Great Britain.

The various Methodist denominations

The largest was the parent body, the Wesleyan Methodist Connexion, from which a number of offshoots had sprung. The Primitive Methodists were the second largest of these, having arisen in the first decade of the nineteenth century following the conversion of Hugh Bourne and a number of others in Staffordshire to the north of Stoke on Trent. They had sought to recover the early faith and practice of John Wesley at a time when the Wesleyans were hoping to become more respectable. Their return to Wesley's field preaching, notably in the form of Camp Meetings, did not suit the Wesleyans at that time, and Bourne was put out of membership along with several of his companions. Continuing their evangelism, they began the new group, a "connexion" in Methodist terminology, in 1811, taking the name Primitive Methodists in 1812.

The United Methodists were the other group involved in the 1932 union. This denomination was created by the United Methodist Church Act 1907, which united three existing organisations: the Methodist New Connexion (founded in 1797), the Bible Christian Church (formed in 1815), and the United Methodist Free Churches (formed in 1857).

Hymn Book

As a part of the Methodist Union, a new volume, The Methodist Hymn Book, was compiled and published in 1933. This included 984 hymns drawn from the various merging groups, as well as a selection of the Psalms. A separate version of the hymn book was also prepared for use in Australia and New Zealand, which appeared in 1935.

Wesleyan Reform Union

The Wesleyan Reform Union remains independent, and many of its members do not accept the description Methodist. They arose in the mid-nineteenth century, mainly in the Erewash Valley area of Derbyshire, and emphasise the early teachings of Wesley. They also use a Methodist hymn book. One main difference from other Methodists is that every local congregation is autonomous, and cannot be dictated to by a central body. However, they are joined in a union for mutual support.

See also 
 History of Christianity in Britain
 List of Methodist denominations

References

Further reading

Methodist Union – Dictionary of Methodism in Britain and Ireland

External links 
The Methodist Church (UK) web site history section
 The Wesleyan Reform Union

Methodism in the United Kingdom